Lanthanum cuprate usually refers to the inorganic compound with the formula CuLa2O4.  The name implies that the compound consists of a cuprate (CuOn]2n-) salt of lanthanum (La3+).  In fact it is a highly covalent solid.  It is prepared by high temperature reaction of lanthanum oxide and copper(II) oxide follow by annealing under oxygen.

The material adopts a tetragonal structure related topotassium tetrafluoronickelate (K2NiF4), which is orthorhombic.  Replacement of some lanthanum by barium gives the quaternary phase CuLa1.85Ba0.15O4, called lanthanum barium copper oxide. That doped material displays superconductivity at −243 K, which at the time of its discovery was a high temperature.  This discovery initiated research on cuprate superconductors and was the basis of a Nobel Prize in Physics to Georg Bednorz and K. Alex Müller.

References

Inorganic compounds
Chemical substances